Reguramasamudram is a village in the Pattukkottai taluk of Thanjavur district, Tamil Nadu, India.

Demographics 

As per the 2001 census, Reguramasamudram had a total population of 316 with 146 males and 170 females. The sex ratio was 1164. The literacy rate was 74.39.

References 

 

Villages in Thanjavur district